The Institut supérieur de l'électronique et du numérique (ISEN; Higher Institute for Electronics and Digital Training) is a group composed of four French grandes écoles (higher education establishments). They propose a high level engineering program in ICT (information and communication technologies), Micro & Nanotechnologies and Innovative Design.

Introduction 

The ISEN group is a consortium of four grandes écoles whose main site is located in Lille. The different establishments are:

 ISEN Brest (Western France)
 ISEN Nantes (Western France)
 ISEN Rennes (Western France)
 ISEN Caen (Western France)
 ISEN Lille (Northern France)
 ISEN Toulon (Southern France)
 ISEN Fès (Morocco)

ISEN 
The ISEN-Lille/Toulon/Brest building is attached and located in the campus.
Research Labs and teaching rooms are both located in the same building.

Formations for Engineer degree

Studies at ISEN consist in courses in electronics, computer sciences and computer network, micro-electronics, and also acoustics, physics, signal processing and telecommunications. The curriculum is covered in 5 or 3 years of studies according to the degree when entering the school. Studies are structured in bachelor's and master's levels but all students obtain the same degree Diplôme d’Ingénieur which is equivalent to a master's degree. Two options at Bachelor's level are offered: "Networks & Computer Science" and "Engineering Sciences". During the last two years, each student personalizes his own syllabus according to his favorite fields. The five following options are proposed at Master's level:

 Multimedia, Information Systems & Networks (MISN),
 Digital Systems & Applications (DTA),
 Project Management & Business Development (PMBD),
 High Technology & Innovative Design (HTID),
 High Technology & Environment (HTE).

The ISEN group is member of the Conférence des Grandes Écoles . The ISEN provides an engineering degree certified by the Ministry of Higher Education and Research and accredited by the Commission des Titres d'Ingénieur.

ISEN is in relation with universities all around the world in the field of educational exchange or research activities. Each ISEN student spent at least two months abroad during an educational exchange or an internship. International students are welcome to study in all the subjects offered by ISEN. However, Bachelor's courses are taught in French, and candidates are required to master French at the B2 level at a minimum.

Research at ISEN

Research activities are recognized worldwide in all the applications of Electronics: Control Engineering, IT, Telecommunications, Networking, Microelectronics as well as Nanosciences. Currently, research at ISEN consists of more than 150 researchers (30 of them being CNRS) who belong to 8 departments: Physics, Electronics, Micro/Nano-electronics, Acoustics, Computer Science, Robotics, Optoelectronics and Microsystems. Furthermore, ISEN is one of the regulatory authorities of two Joint Research Units, namely IEMN (UMR 8520 - Lille) and IM2NP (UMR 7334 – Marseille).

Admission 

Admission to ISEN is possible either after the baccalauréat or after two year scientific undergraduate studies. This admission is made through a selective examination. There is however further possibility to join the ISEN later on after 2 years of studies in a classe préparatoire aux grandes écoles (CPGE).

History 

 1956 - ISEN is founded by Norbert Ségard,
 1960 - ISEN is accredited by the Commission des Titres d'Ingénieur,
 1991 - ISEN Toulon is founded,
 1994 - ISEN Brest is founded,
 2012 - ISEN Fes is founded
 2016 - ISEN Nîme is founded
 2017 - ISEN Nantes is founded
 2019 - ISEN Caen is founded

Alumni 

The ISEN alumni association AI-ISEN supports the ISEN students to find an internship, the ISEN graduates and organizes events. and funding campaigns for the Fondation Norbert Ségard.

External links 
 Official site of ISEN group
 Official website of the ISEN alumni
 Website of a ISEN student BDE club
 Website of the ISEN Junior enterprise

electronique and numerique
Engineering universities and colleges in France
Educational institutions established in 1956
Technical universities and colleges in France
1956 establishments in France